The 2022 CS Lombardia Trophy Memorial Anna Grandolfi was held on September 16–18, 2022 in Bergamo, Italy. It was part of the 2022–23 ISU Challenger Series. Medals were awarded in the disciplines of men's singles, women's singles, and ice dance.

Entries 
The International Skating Union published the list of entries on August 22, 2022.

Changes to preliminary assignments

Results

Men

Women

Ice dance

References 

Lombardia Trophy
2022 in figure skating
CS Lombardia
Sport in Bergamo